The following is a list of football stadiums in Bangladesh,  Currently, stadiums with a capacity of 5,000 or more are included.

Current stadiums

See also
 List of Asian stadiums by capacity
 List of association football stadiums by capacity

References

External links
 FootballGroundMap.com
 GroundHop.com

 
Bangladesh
Football stadiums